Gypsum is a village in south-eastern Bhutan. It is located in Pemagatshel District. At the 2005 census, its population was 330.

References 

Populated places in Bhutan